is a former Japanese Nippon Professional Baseball player. He is currently a coach for Tohoku Rakuten Golden Eagles in Japan's Pacific League.

External links

Japan Baseball Daily

Living people
1983 births
Baseball people from Kobe
Japanese baseball players
Nippon Professional Baseball infielders
Tohoku Rakuten Golden Eagles players
Japanese baseball coaches
Nippon Professional Baseball coaches